is a railway station in Teine-ku, Sapporo, Hokkaido, Japan, operated by Hokkaido Railway Company (JR Hokkaido). The station is numbered S07.

Lines
Teine Station is served by the Hakodate Main Line.

Station layout
The station consists of two island platforms serving four tracks, with the station situated above the tracks. The station has automated ticket machines, automated turnstiles which accept Kitaca, and a "Midori no Madoguchi" staffed ticket office.

Platforms

Adjacent stations

Surrounding area
 National Route 5 (to Hakodate)
 Hokkaido Institute of Technology

References

External links
 Teine JR Hokkaido map

Railway stations in Japan opened in 1880
Teine-ku, Sapporo
Railway stations in Sapporo